Madrasa El Achouria is one of the madrasahs of the medina of Tunis. It was built in the Ottoman Tunisia.

This madrasa became a heritage monument on October 19, 1992.

Location 
Located at 62 Haouanet Achour Street, from which come its name, this madrasa is the only one that has a minaret (15,3 meters high).

It was built on the remains of Madrasa Ibn Tafargine.

References 

Achouria